Stony Brook station is a rapid transit station in Boston, Massachusetts. It serves the MBTA Orange Line and is located below grade at Boylston Street in the Jamaica Plain neighborhood. The station opened on May 4, 1987, as part of the Southwest Corridor project, replacing an earlier station that was open from 1897 to 1940.

History

Starting in 1891, the Old Colony Railroad (acquired in 1893 by the New York, New Haven and Hartford Railroad) raised the section of its main line through Jamaica Plain (extending from Massachusetts Avenue to the current location of Forest Hills station) onto a 4-track stone embankment to eliminate dangerous grade crossings.  The project involved the replacement of the three NYNH&H stations in Roxbury and Jamaica Plain (at Roxbury Crossing, Jamaica Plain, and Forest Hills) with elevated stations, and the construction of two new stations at Heath Street and Boylston Street.  Boylston Street station opened on June 1, 1897, along with the other four new and rebuilt stations.

Although the five NYNH&H stations in Roxbury and Jamaica Plain continued to operate for over three decades following the southward extension of the Washington Street Elevated, they were ultimately unable to compete with the Elevated, and all, including Boylston Street, were closed on September 29, 1940 due to a lack of passengers.

In the 1960s, plans took hold to extend I-95 into downtown Boston along the NYNH&H's right-of-way and to replace the Washington Street Elevated (after 1967 known as the Orange Line) with a rapid transit line running in the new highway's median. Although the project was halted by highway revolts in 1969 and the February 11, 1970 announcement by Governor Francis W. Sargent of a moratorium on new highway construction within the Route 128 corridor, and eventually cancelled by Governor Sargent in 1972, the right-of-way had already been cleared.  This empty strip of land (known as the Southwest Corridor) was eventually developed into the Southwest Corridor Park, and the Orange Line was moved to a new alignment along the Corridor in 1987 despite the cancellation of the project originally calling for its relocation.  This included a new rapid transit station at Boylston Street, on the site of the former NYNH&H station, named Stony Brook after the former watercourse of the same name. (The name was determined in 1985 as part of a series of station name changes.) The Washington Street Elevated was permanently closed on April 30, 1987, and the new southern half of the Orange Line, including Stony Brook, opened on May 4.

Since the route 48 bus was discontinued on July 1, 2012, Stony Brook has no bus connections. Jackson Square, the next stop to the north, is a major bus transfer station.

The entire Orange Line, including Stony Brook station, was closed from August 19 to September 18, 2022, during maintenance work.

References

External links

MBTA - Stony Brook
 Boylston Street entrance from Google Maps Street View

Jamaica Plain, Boston
Orange Line (MBTA) stations
Railway stations located underground in Boston
Railway stations in the United States opened in 1897
Railway stations closed in 1940
Railway stations in the United States opened in 1987
Stations along Boston and Providence Railroad lines